Black Belt Systems WinImages is a bitmap graphics editor and special effects applicator that supports both automation of editing tasks and animation of effects. WinImages is a MDI application which runs under Windows 95 and later versions of Microsoft Windows.

WinImages began life in 1985 as a product called ImageMaster. It was ported to Windows in 1989, which is when the name was changed to WinImages.

As of December 2004, WinImages is at version 7.5.

Summary of WinImages features
Timeline for animation on still image, and animation on animation
177 image manipulation operation classes in 15 functional groups
790 built-in static or timeline-aware controls
Unlimited number of scripted timeline-aware controls
Integral ray tracer with timeline-aware engine
Integral heightfield renderer with timeline-aware engine
Integral particle system renderer with timeline-aware engine
Integral texture generator with timeline-aware engine
74 layer modes, the usual 20 or so, plus unusual modes like geometric warping
14 area selection tools
Embedded custom scripting language similar to BASIC
RGB, HSV, CMY and CMYK color separation
Open plug-in specification (presumes C is development language) with services
Reads 340 variations of 22 different bitmap image file types
Writes 25 variations of 13 different bitmap image file types
Additional animation types are extended by Windows 32-bit CODECS

See also
List of raster graphics editors
Comparison of raster graphics editors

External links
Black Belt Systems
Graphic Market
Official Page
Tutorials
In-Depth Review
Scripts and Plug-Ins
Plug-in Developer Docs
Twitter References

Raster graphics editors